The Japanese patrol boat Mizuho is a PLH type patrol vessels of the Japan Coast Guard.

Design
As well as being a platform for helicopters, she also functions as a depot ship: replenishing fuel, potable water and stores to small patrol crafts and resting their crew. And as a frontline command center, she also has excellent command and control functions.

She is armed with one Bofors L/70 40 mm gun (Bofors 40 Mk4) and one JM61-RFS 20 mm gun, each controlled by an electro-optical director. The Sikorsky S-76D helicopters was supposed to be used as the shipboard helicopters, but in actual, the Bell 412 helicopters were transferred directly from the PLH-21.

References

Bibliography

External links
 
 海上保安廳大型直昇機巡視船 

Patrol vessels of the Japan Coast Guard
2018 ships
Ships built by Mitsubishi Heavy Industries